Beata Kaczmarska (born 5 July 1970 in Warsaw, Mazowieckie) is a former female racewalker from Poland, who represented her native country at the 1992 Summer Olympics in Barcelona, Spain. She set her personal best (44:07) in the women's 10 km walk event in 1992.

Achievements

References
 sports-reference

1970 births
Living people
Polish female racewalkers
Athletes (track and field) at the 1992 Summer Olympics
Olympic athletes of Poland
Athletes from Warsaw
Skra Warszawa athletes